The 1913 Lafayette football team was an American football team that represented Lafayette College as an independent during the 1913 college football season. In its second and final season under head coach George McCaa, the team compiled an 4–5–1 record. William Wagenhurst was the team captain.  The team played its home games at March Field in Easton, Pennsylvania.

Schedule

References

Lafayette
Lafayette Leopards football seasons
Lafayette football